Domenech is a rapid transit station in San Juan, Puerto Rico, located in the Hato Rey Central district close to the Milla de Oro financial district. The station is named after the Manuel Domenech Avenue where it is located. The station opened on December 17, 2004. It features a tile mural by the artist Liliana Porter titled El Viajero.

Nearby 
 Puerto Rico Department of Labor
EDP University, Hato Rey Campus
AEELA offices

See also 
 List of San Juan Tren Urbano stations

References

Tren Urbano stations
Railway stations in the United States opened in 2004
2004 establishments in Puerto Rico